Admiral Humphrey Wykeham Bowring CB DSO (18 April 1874 – 21 February 1952) was a Royal Navy officer who became Commander-in-Chief, Coast of Scotland.

Naval career
Born the son of the industrialist John Charles Bowring, Bowring joined the Royal Navy as a cadet in 1887, took part in the Witu expedition in 1890 and was promoted to Lieutenant in 1895. He served in World War I as Captain of the cruiser HMS Arrogant and then of the cruiser HMS Aurora and acted as Chief of Staff to the Commander-in-Chief, Dover Patrol. After the War he commanded the battleship HMS Bellerophon and then the battleship HMS Centurion. He was appointed Commander-in-Chief, Coast of Scotland in 1926 and retired in 1929.

He lived at Plympton in Devon.

Family
In 1924 he married Rose Dalby.

References

1874 births
1952 deaths
Royal Navy admirals
Companions of the Order of the Bath
Companions of the Distinguished Service Order
Humphrey
Royal Navy personnel of World War I